Guglielmo Sinaz (20 November 1885 – 5 February 1947) was an Italian film actor. He appeared in more than 60 films between 1935 and 1947. He was born and died in Rome, Italy.

Selected filmography

 I Love You Only (1935)
 The Great Appeal (1936)
 It Was I! (1937)
 Hands Off Me! (1937)
 The Last Enemy (1938)
 Luciano Serra, Pilot (1938)
 Naples of Olden Times (1938)
 Star of the Sea (1938)
 All of Life in One Night (1938)
 The Cuckoo Clock (1938)
 Princess Tarakanova (1938)
 We Were Seven Sisters (1939)
 Diamonds (1939)
 The Silent Partner (1939)
 Non me lo dire! (1940)
 Then We'll Get a Divorce (1940)
 The Prisoner of Santa Cruz (1941)
 Light in the Darkness (1941)
 A Husband for the Month of April (1941)
 Bengasi (1942)
 Two Hearts (1943)
 Harlem (1943)
 Without a Woman (1943)
 Before Him All Rome Trembled (1946)
 The Great Dawn (1947)

References

External links

1885 births
1947 suicides
Italian male film actors
Suicides in Italy
Male actors from Rome
20th-century Italian male actors
1947 deaths